Kullursandhai is a village located in Virudhunagar district in the South Indian state of Tamil Nadu. Agriculture is a common revenue generator for the village.

Villages in Virudhunagar district